Wahab Shah railway station is located in Wahab Shah village, Sanghar district of Sindh, Pakistan.

See also
 List of railway stations in Pakistan
 Pakistan Railways

References

External links

Railway stations in Sanghar District
Railway stations on Karachi–Peshawar Line (ML 1)